This is a list of flags used in Belgium.

National flag

Ensign

Military

Sub-national

Regions and communities

Provinces

Community Commissions in Brussels

Municipalities

Royal standards

Monarch
Each royal standard for a monarch is a square rouge ponceau banner of the royal arms, personalised with the king's cypher in each corner.

Historical Flags

Wallonia

Colonial

Political flags

House flags of Belgian freight companies

Other

References

Belgium
Flags